Ronen "Neno" Ginzburg (born 19 September 1963) is an Israeli-Czech basketball coach for the Czech national team, coaching them at the EuroBasket 2015 and 2017, and at the 2020 Summer Olympics.

In October 2020 he was granted a Czech citizenship.

See also
List of Jews in sports (non-players)

References

1963 births
Living people
Basketball Nymburk coaches
Czech Jews
Israeli Ashkenazi Jews
Israeli basketball coaches
Israeli men's basketball players
Israeli expatriate basketball people in the Czech Republic
Naturalized citizens of the Czech Republic
Sportspeople from Tel Aviv
Olympic coaches
Naturalised sports competitors